John Parr (born 1952) is a British musician.

John Parr may also refer to:
 Sir John Parr (sheriff), sheriff of Westmoreland, c. 1462–1473, younger brother of William Parr, 1st Baron Parr of Kendal
 John Parr (colonial governor) (1725–1791), British Army officer and Governor of Nova Scotia
 John Parr (gunmaker) (died 1798), English merchant and Mayor of Liverpool
 John Edmeston Parr (1856–1923), British-born Canadian architect
 John Parr (British Army soldier) (1898–1914), believed to have been the first British soldier killed in World War I
 John Wayne Parr (born 1976), Australian kickboxer
 John Parr (album), 1984 debut album by John Parr

See also
Parr (surname)
Jack Parr (disambiguation)